Guillermo Daniel Rivarola (born April 28, 1967 in Villa Huidobro, Argentina) is an Argentine former footballer and currently is the Technical Director of Komets-River Plate. He played as a defender for many clubs in Argentina and Mexico such as River Plate, San Lorenzo, Racing Club. He retired playing for Racing.

Rivarola won 3 Primera Division Argentina with River Plate and 1 with San Lorenzo. He had a short tenure in Mexico playing for Pachuca and for Monterrey. As manager he coached Racing Club and Olimpo. On June 4, 2009 he was named Manager of C.F. Pachuca where he won the 2009–10 CONCACAF Champions League. Later he was the Director of Pachuca Youth System Development.

On December 21, 2010 Guillermo Rivarola was named Manager of Sporting Cristal from Peruvian First Division League for the 2011 season. On March 20, 2011 he was involved in a bitter dispute with fellow Argentine manager Marcelo Trobbiani of Cienciano after protesting to the referee in order to get him sent off.

Accomplishments as River Plate Technical Secretary
Copa Sudamerica 2014
Recopa Sudamerica 2014
Copa Libertadores de America 2015
Copa Suruga Bank 2015
Recopa Sudamerica 2015
Copa Argentina 2016 and 2017
Supercopa Argentina 2017

Honours

Player
 River Plate
Primera Division Argentina: Apertura 1991, Apertura 1993, Apertura 1994
Copa Libertadores: 1996

 San Lorenzo
Primera Division Argentina: Clausura 2001

Manager
 Pachuca
CONCACAF Champions League: 2009–10

References

External links
 Argentine Primera statistics at Fútbol XXI  

1967 births
Living people
Association football defenders
Argentine footballers
Argentine Primera División players
Liga MX players
Club Atlético River Plate footballers
C.F. Pachuca players
C.F. Monterrey players
Argentine football managers
Racing Club de Avellaneda footballers
San Lorenzo de Almagro footballers
Santos Laguna footballers
Racing Club de Avellaneda managers
Olimpo managers
Sporting Cristal managers
C.F. Pachuca managers
C.D. Cuenca managers
Footballers from Buenos Aires
Argentine expatriate footballers
Expatriate footballers in Mexico
Expatriate football managers in Peru
Expatriate football managers in Mexico
Argentine expatriate sportspeople in Mexico